"Sound of Drums" is a song by English psychedelic rock band Kula Shaker, released as the lead single from their second studio album, Peasants, Pigs & Astronauts (1999). With lyrics by frontman Crispian Mills and music composed by the whole band, the track takes musical inspiration from American rock band the Doors and received production from Rick Rubin and George Drakoulias, as Mills wanted to track to have a more "American" sound than their previous works. "Sound of Drums" was issued as a single on 20 April 1998 and debuted at number three on the UK Singles Chart the same month, becoming Kula Shaker's fifth and final top-10 hit in the United Kingdom.

Background
"Sound of Drums" was conceived in 1997, during recording sessions at Ocean Way Studios in Los Angeles. According to Crispian Mills, the band recruited Rick Rubin and George Drakoulias to produce the track since their previous album, K (1996), did not properly emulate the energy of their live performances. Mills stated that he was happy to be working in California since he could associate with people from different cultures and utilise their ideas for Kula Shaker's music. He also wanted to focus more on the song's instrumentation, centring it around the Hammond organ while keeping the band's 1960s influences intact.

Release and promotion
In late March, Columbia Records began promoting "Sound of Drums" in the UK with a poster campaign and radio airplay. The week before its release, this promotion expanded to include full-page ads in various music publications. Kula Shaker also commenced a limited-access 12-date tour in the UK to demonstrate the tracks they had already recorded for Peasants, Pigs & Astronauts, and they also played at The Viper Room in Los Angeles to evaluate American reactions.

Following copious airplay, "Sound of Drums" was released commercially in the UK on 20 April 1998 across three formats: two CD singles and a cassette single. The first CD single contains the album version of "Sound of Drums" along with B-sides "Hurry on Sundown (Hari Om Sundown)" (a Hawkwind cover), "Fairyland", and "Reflections of Love" from the short film of the same name. For CD2, the album version is switched out for the radio edit, "Hurry on Sundown" is retained, and two new tracks appear: "The One That Got Away" and "Smile", the latter of which also from Reflections of Love. The cassette single contains only the album version of "Sound of Drums" and "Hurry on Sundown". On Peasants, Pigs & Astronauts, released on 8 March 1999, the song appears as the eighth track.

Reception
On the issue of 11 April 1998, British trade paper Music Week reviewed "Sound of Drums", noting its Doors-influenced sound and "anthemic" lyrics. British columnist James Masterton also compared the song to works by the Doors, calling it "energetic" but criticising its originality, writing that "Smash Mouth's Walking On The Sun may have been the more effective Doors pastiche." Upon its release, "Sound of Drums" debuted and peaked at number three on the UK Singles Chart, becoming Kula Shaker's fifth and final top-10 hit in the UK and staying in the top 100 for eight weeks. On the Eurochart Hot 100, the single reached number 16 during its second week on the ranking. Outside the UK, the song charted in Ireland but did not reach the top 30.

Track listings
UK CD1
 "Sound of Drums" (album version) – 4:32
 "Hurry on Sundown (Hari Om Sundown)" – 4:38
 "Reflections of Love" (from the short film Reflections of Love) – 2:11
 "Fairyland" (featuring Don Pecker) – 3:20

UK CD2
 "Sound of Drums" (radio edit) – 4:15
 "Hurry on Sundown (Hari Om Sundown)" – 4:38
 "The One That Got Away" – 3:21
 "Smile" (from the short film Reflections of Love) – 2:21

UK cassette single
 "Sound of Drums" (album version) – 4:32
 "Hurry on Sundown (Hari Om Sundown)" – 4:38

Personnel
Personnel are taken from the UK CD1 liner notes and the Peasants, Pigs & Astronauts album booklet.

 Kula Shaker – music
 Crispian Mills – lyrics, vocals, acoustic guitars, electric guitars, co-production
 Alonza Bevan – backing vocals, acoustic guitar loops, bass
 Jay Darlington – Wurlitzer piano, organs, keyboards
 Paul Winterhart – drums
 Graham Pattison – loops and soundscapes
 Rick Rubin – production

 George Drakoulias – production
 Fulton Dingley – mixing
 Sylvia Massy – engineering
 Jim Scott – engineering
 Stylorouge – artwork design
 Daniel Abbott – illustration

Charts

References

1998 singles
1998 songs
Columbia Records singles
Kula Shaker songs
Song recordings produced by Rick Rubin
Songs written by Crispian Mills